Rafael dos Santos Silva (born 27 August 1982) is a Brazilian football player.

Club statistics

References

External links

Oita Trinita

1982 births
Living people
Brazilian footballers
Super League Greece players
Campeonato Brasileiro Série A players
J1 League players
Guarani FC players
Sport Club Corinthians Paulista players
Grêmio Foot-Ball Porto Alegrense players
Clube Atlético Juventus players
Oita Trinita players
Brazilian expatriate footballers
Expatriate footballers in Greece
Expatriate footballers in Japan
Association football forwards
Footballers from São Paulo